Muhammad Hanif Nadvi (10 June 1908 – 12 July 1987) was an Islamic scholar, theologian, and commentator of the Qur'an from Pakistan.

Biography
Nadvi was born on 10 June 1908 in Gujranwala, British India (now Pakistan). When he completed his primary education in the home town, his father gave him under the discipleship of Maulana Ismail Salafi, so he could receive the education of language and literature from him. Salafi saw the true thirst for knowledge in his student and sent him to Nadwatul Ulama, Lucknow, in 1925. Staying there, Nadvi completed his studies of Qur'an, tafsir, hadith, fiqh, logic, etc. from the best scholars of the time. His proficiency in Arabic reached the level that he gave a speech in Arabic for half an hour on the subject of The Impact of the Qur'an on Arabic Literature in a meeting held in Kanpur in the presence of scholars like Hakeem Ajmal Khan and Syed Sulaiman Nadvi. At the age of 24, he started writing a commentary on Qur'an, Siraj-ul-Bayan.

Nadvi mastered the  English through his personal efforts and familiarized himself with modern Western philosophy. Then he joined the Institute of Islamic Culture in 1951. At that time, the director of the institution was the philosopher Khalifa Abdul Hakim. Staying in his company, Nadvi's philosophical skills got sharpened and he remained associated with the institution for life. He wrote several valuable books on Quran, Hadith, and Islamic philosophy. He also remained a member of the Council of Islamic Ideology, Pakistan.

Nadvi died on 12 July 1987 in Lahore.

Works
 Tafseer Siraj ul Bayan (5 volumes)
 Afkar ibn e Khaldoon
 Afkar ibn e Khaldoon
 Aqliyat e Ibn e Taimmiya
 Mirzaiat – Naey Zawion Se
 Ta'alimaat e Ghazali
 Chehra e Nubwat
 Musalmano Ke Aqayed o Afkar
 Mutala e Quran
 Muatala e Hadith
 Masla e Ijtehad
 Sarguzasht e Ghazali
 Qadeem Unani Falsafa

References

1908 births
1987 deaths
People from Gujranwala
20th-century Pakistani philosophers
Urdu-language writers
Darul Uloom Nadwatul Ulama
20th-century Muslim scholars of Islam
Darul Uloom Nadwatul Ulama alumni
Pakistani Muslim scholars of Islam